Crisis: The Japanese Attack on Pearl Harbor and Southeast Asia is a 1992 book written by Allan Beekman, who also wrote The Niihau Incident and Hawaiian Tales. Crisis organizes into a coherent whole the elements that coalesced into the tragedy of Pearl Harbor.

External links 
Review of Crisis The Historian (subscription required)
Review of Crisis Journal of Southeast Asian Studies (subscription required)

1992 non-fiction books
History books about World War II